Roos de Jong (Haarlem, born 23 August 1993) is a Dutch rower.  She won the bronze medal at the 2020 Summer Olympics in the double sculls event together with Lisa Scheenaard, whom she has rowed with since 2017.  She has also won a medal at the 2019 World Rowing Championships.

In addition to rowing, de Jong also has a passion for design.  She, along with Bjorn van den Ende, designed the rowing unisuit worn by the Dutch national team at the 2020 Tokyo Olympic Games. She went into isolation, after a coach and team mate tested positive for Covid-19.

References

External links
 

1993 births
Living people
Dutch female rowers
World Rowing Championships medalists for the Netherlands
European Rowing Championships medalists
Olympic rowers of the Netherlands
Rowers at the 2020 Summer Olympics
Medalists at the 2020 Summer Olympics
Olympic medalists in rowing
Olympic bronze medalists for the Netherlands
21st-century Dutch women